A Nice Cup of Tea is a 1950 mystery thriller novel by the British writer Anthony Gilbert. It was published in the United States under the alternative title The Wrong Body. It is the twenty fourth in the long-running series featuring the unscrupulous lawyer and detective Arthur Crook.

Television adaptation
In 1957 it was adapted into a British television film My Guess Would Be Murder, produced by the BBC and starring Nora Nicholson, Everley Gregg and Ethel Coleridge.

References

1950 British novels
British mystery novels
British thriller novels
Novels by Anthony Gilbert
British detective novels
Collins Crime Club books